Hobb Lake (also called Bates Sawmill Pond) is a major reservoir located in Winslow Township, New Jersey. It was once open for public swimming and was called "The Lake of the Four Fountains". It is formed by the Pump Branch, a tributary of Albertson Brook.

Recreation
Fishing is a popular activity at Hobb Lake. Great Times Day Camp, situated on Hobb Lake, is one of Southern New Jersey's popular summer camps. Camp Haluwasa, an older and still popular Christian children's camp and retreat, is located directly adjacent with its own 60 acres of lake waters, fed by Hobb Lake.

References

Bodies of water of Camden County, New Jersey
Reservoirs in New Jersey
Winslow Township, New Jersey